Anna Amalia or Anna Amalie may refer to:

Anna Amalie of Baden-Durlach, Countess of Nassau-Saarbrücken (1595—1651), regent of Nassau-Saarbrücken from 1640 until her death
Princess Anna Amalie of Prussia or Anna Amalia, Abbess of Quedlinburg (1723–1787), Princess-Abbess of Quedlinburg and composer
Anna Amalia, Duchess of Saxe-Weimar-Eisenach (née Anna Amalia of Brunswick-Wolfenbüttel, 1739–1807) German composer and patron of the arts
Duchess Anna Amalia Library, in Weimar
:de:Anna Amalia zu den drei Rosen, a Masonic lodge

A number of Annas have the middle name Amalia:

Anna Abert or Anna Amalie Abert (1906–1996), German musicologist
Anna Amelia Obermeyer (1907–2001), South African botanist